Westerwolde (Gronings: Westerwoolde) is a municipality in the province of Groningen in the northeast of the Netherlands.

The municipalities of Bellingwedde and Vlagtwedde have merged into the new municipality of Westerwolde on 1 January 2018. The municipality continues to use both municipal halls in Sellingen and Wedde.

Geography

The municipality is located in the southeast of the province of Groningen at the border with Drenthe and in the northeast of the Netherlands at the border with Germany. Neighbouring municipalities in the Netherlands are Oldambt in the north, Pekela and Stadskanaal in the west, Borger-Odoorn in the southwest, and Emmen in the south. Neighbouring municipalities in Germany are Bunde in the northeast, Rhede, Dörpen, and Lathen in the east, and Haren in the southeast.

Politics
On 22 November 2017, municipal elections were held to elect the members of the municipal council of Westerwolde. The result is shown in the table below. The municipal council will have 19 seats, because the population size was just under 25,000 in 2017.

Notable people 
 Siert Bruins (1921 in Weite – 2015) a Dutch member of the SS and SD during World War II
 Minze Stuiver (born 1929 in Vlagtwedde) a geochemist and geoscience researcher especially in radiocarbon dating
 Jan Mulder (born 1945 in Bellingwolde) former footballer with 200 caps, writer, columnist and TV personality
 Geert Meijer (born 1951 in Sellingen) football manager and former professional player with 295 caps
 Anja Hazekamp (born 1968 in Vlagtwedde) politician and Member of the European Parliament
 Claudia Bokel (born 1973 in Ter Apel) a German épée fencer, silver medallist at the 2004 Summer Olympics
 Rindert van Zinderen Bakker (Ter Apel 1912 - Almere Haven 1993) member of the Dutch Resistance in WWII, Dachau deportee, and politician

Gallery

References

External links

  (in Dutch)

 
Municipalities of Groningen (province)
Municipalities of the Netherlands established in 2018